Western Dubuque High School (commonly West Dubuque, West Dub, WDHS, or WD) is a four-year public high school located in Epworth, Iowa. It is one of two high schools in the Western Dubuque Community School District, and enrolls 935 students in grades 9-12. The school's mascot is the Bobcat, and it competes in class 3A of the Mississippi Valley Conference.

History
The campus was built in 1962. The first class graduated one year later.

Campus
Western Dubuque High School is located at 302 5th Avenue SW in Epworth, Iowa, a town of 1,580 people. The campus is along U.S. Highway 20 and Jacoby Drive W, near Divine Word College. The one-story school building was built in 1962, and the campus includes its own football field. The school recently added a new addition containing two new gyms, a large commons area, two boys and two girls locker rooms, as well as a state-of-the-art wrestling room and weight room. During the 2014-2015 school year, the school had welcomed a new office and a new auditorium. In the 2015-2016 school year, an auto mechanics and metalworking shop were completed and open to the public in the 2016-2017 school year. Plans to build a new carpentry shop and services garage are in the works as of the 2018-2019 school year, but there is no estimate on when they will be finished.

Students
In the 2009-2010 school year, Western Dubuque High School enrolled 747 life changing, miracle arranging students. Of those, 713 (95%) were White, 14 (2%) were Black, 2 (0.27%) were Asian, and none were American Indian. 11 (1%) students were Hispanic, and may be of any race. Additionally, 372 (49.8%) were male, and 375 (50.2%) were female.

Communities served
Areas within the school's attendance zone include: Balltown, Bankston, Centralia, Dyersville, Epworth, Farley, Luxemburg, Holy Cross,  New Vienna, Peosta, almost all of Rickardsville, and Worthington. All are completely or partially in Dubuque County. It also serves the unincorporated area of Petersburg.

Athletics
The Bobocats participate in the Mississippi Valley Conference in the following sports:.

Girls 
Cross Country
Volleyball 
Basketball - 1987 State Champions (5v5)
Track
Golf
Soccer
Softball
Tennis
Bowling

Boys 
Cross Country
Football – 2001 and 2019 State Champions (3A)
Basketball – 2001 State Champions (3A)
Wrestling
Track
Golf
Soccer
Baseball
Tennis
Bowling – 2011 (1A),  2012 (1A), 2018 (2A) State Team Champions

Arts

Band 

Western Dubuque High School has had its ups in down in the music department.  Early in the school history, it was known for its excellence in music, particularly in marching band.  The Bobcat Marching Band, has made many national appearances, including at the Macy's Thanksgiving Day Parade, the Tournament of Roses Parade, the Cotton Bowl Parade, two Presidential Inauguration parades, the Indianapolis 500 parade, and the 2011 Allstate Sugar Bowl in New Orleans.  The band consists of 80+ members and has won numerous division I ratings at state as well as best drumline, flags, hornline, and drum majors. As well as marching band, Western Dubuque High School offers concert band and jazz band, both in which have received division I at state contest.

Choir 

Western Dubuque High School has three choirs.  The concert choir offers more literature pieces and have many performances throughout the school year.  There are also two show choir groups. The first is an all female junior varsity group called the "Aristocats". This group consist of 46 all female members that audition at the end of each school year.  The group has several performances throughout the year and competes January through March around the state.  The final group is called "5th Avenue".  This group is a competitive co-ed varsity show choir group that consist of 42 singer/dancers, a band, and a crew that audition at the end of each school year.  "5th Avenue" competes at the 3A level in Iowa, Wisconsin, Illinois, and Minnesota.  This group has won numerous awards as well as made it finals in its 18 years of existence and continues to grow. "5th Avenue" is one of the well known and competitive 3A show choir groups in Iowa.  They perform several times per school year and on top of their competition show they as learn a Halloween show which "5th Avenue" performs at their annual Halloween Hoot and a pops show which they perform at the end of the year.  Both "5th Avenue" and "Aristocats" host 4 shows each year which include: the Halloween Hoot (an annual Halloween fair/show), the Holiday Cathedral Concert (an annual Holiday tradition which doesn't include dancing and held in a Basilica), the Winter Gala (Both groups first appearance with their competition shows), and they both host a show choir invitational called the MAIN EVENT which hosts many of the top show choir groups in the Midwest and has been well known ever since it started.

See also
 Epworth, Iowa
 List of high schools in Iowa
 Western Dubuque Community School District

References

External links
 Western Dubuque High School Website

Educational institutions established in 1962
1962 establishments in Iowa
Public high schools in Iowa
Schools in Dubuque County, Iowa